Jeffrey N. Cox is Arts and Sciences Professor of Distinction in English Literature and Humanities and Chair of the Department of English at the University of Colorado Boulder. He is the author or editor of ten books and more than forty scholarly articles. Cox specializes in English and European Romanticism, cultural theory, and cultural studies. He is a leading scholar of late eighteenth- to early nineteenth-century drama and theater; of the Cockney School of poets, which included, among others, John Keats, Percy Shelley, and Leigh Hunt; and of the poetry of William Wordsworth.

Education
Cox received his BA from Wesleyan University in 1975 and his Ph.D. from the University of Virginia in 1981.

Scholarship
Cox was a faculty member at Texas A&M University from 1981 until his appointment in 1998 as the Director of the Center for the Humanities and the Arts (CHA) at the University of Colorado Boulder. In 2006, Cox left the position of CHA Director to become the University's Associate Vice Chancellor of Faculty Affairs, a position he held until 2019. He is currently at work on a project provisionally entitled Communal Romanticism: History, Theory, Method.

Selected honors and awards
In 2008, Cox was selected to give a plenary address at the annual meeting of the North American Society for the Study of Romanticism (NASSR) at the University of Toronto. Cox received the Keats-Shelley Association Distinguished Scholar Award in 2009 for his work on the Keats-Shelley circle, and the 2011 meeting of NASSR at Brigham Young University acknowledged his book In the Shadows of Romance: Romantic Tragic Drama in Germany, England, and France for its "significant impact on the field"  of Romanticism.

Selected honors and awards include:  
 Professor of Distinction, College of Arts & Sciences, University of Colorado Boulder, 2014.
 Distinguished Scholar Award, Keats-Shelley Association, 2009.
 Faculty Fellowship, CU Boulder, 2004–2005.
 South Central Modern Language Association Best Book Award, 2000.
 Scholarly and Creative Work Enhancement Grant, Texas A&M University, 1995.
 Research Fellow, Interdisciplinary Group for Historical Literary Study, Texas A&M University, 1994–1995.
 Association of Former Students Distinguished Teaching Award, Texas A&M University, 1990.
 Huntington-Exxon Research Award, Henry E. Huntington Library, 1986.

Books authored
William Wordsworth, Second-Generation Romantic: Contesting Poetry after Waterloo. Forthcoming, Cambridge University Press, 2021. 
Romanticism in the Shadow of War: Literary Culture in the Napoleonic War Years. Cambridge University Press, 2014. 
Poetry and Politics in the Cockney School: Shelley, Keats, Hunt, and Their Circle. Cambridge University Press, 1998. Winner of the 2000 South Central Modern Language Association Best Book Award. Hardcover , Paperback 
In the Shadows of Romance: Romantic Tragic Drama in Germany, England, and France. Ohio University Press, 1987.

Books edited
Keats's Poetry and Prose. Norton Critical Edition. Norton, 2008. 
The Selected Writings of Leigh Hunt. Vols. 1 and 2: Periodical Essays: 1805–1821. Co-Edited with Greg Kucich. Pickering & Chatto, 2003. 
The Broadview Anthology of Romantic Drama. Co-Edited with Michael Gamer. Broadview Press, 2003. 
Slavery, Abolition and Emancipation: Writings in the British Romantic Period. Vol. 5: The Drama. Pickering and Chatto: 1999.  
New Historical Literary Study. Co-Edited with Larry Reynolds. Princeton University Press, 1993. Hardcover , Paperback 
Seven Gothic Dramas, 1789-1825. Ohio University Press, 1992. Paperback edition, 1993.

Journal editions edited
Guest Editor with Jill Heydt-Stevenson, Special Issue on “Romantic Cosmopolitanism.” European Romantic Review 16 (April 2005).
Guest Editor, Special Issue on Gothic Drama. Gothic Studies 3.2 (August, 2001).

References

External links
Jeffrey N. Cox, English Department Webpage at the University of Colorado

Living people
University of Colorado faculty
Wesleyan University alumni
University of Virginia alumni
1954 births
American academics of English literature